Mill Creek is a  long 1st order tributary to the Uwharrie River, in Randolph County, North Carolina.

Course
Mill Creek rises in a pond on the Walkers Creek divide about 5 miles west-northwest of Pisgah, North Carolina in Randolph County, North Carolina.  Mill Creek then flows west to meet the Uwharrie River about 2 miles east of New Hope.

Watershed
Mill Creek drains  of area, receives about 47.1 in/year of precipitation, has a topographic wetness index of 324.17 and is about 69% forested.

See also
List of rivers of North Carolina

References

Rivers of North Carolina
Rivers of Randolph County, North Carolina